Aciagrion macrootithenae is a damselfly described by Pinhey in 1972.

References

Suhling, F. 2007. Aciagrion macrootithenae. In: IUCN 2007. 2007 IUCN Red List of Threatened Species. <www.iucnredlist.org>. Downloaded on 22 April 2008.

Insects described in 1972
Coenagrionidae